Oscar Espínola (born 10 May 1976 in Guarape, Paraguay) is a Paraguayan footballer currently playing for Argentino de Quilmes of the Tercera División Argentina and in other clubs of Colombia, Venezuela, Bolivia, Argentina and Chile.

Teams
  Arsenal de Sarandí 1995–2003
  UA Maracaibo 2003
  Universidad de Concepción 2004
  Chacarita Juniors 2004
  Oriente Petrolero 2005–2006
  Real Potosí 2006
  Destroyers 2007
  Deportes Quindío 2008
  CD Morón 2008–2009
  Gimnasia y Esgrima (CDU) 2011–2012
  Argentino de Quilmes 2015–present

Personal life
Espínola is the brother of Darío Espínola and uncle of Aníbal Leguizamón.

References

 Profile at BDFA 

1976 births
Living people
Paraguayan footballers
Paraguayan expatriate footballers
Arsenal de Sarandí footballers
UA Maracaibo players
Universidad de Concepción footballers
Chacarita Juniors footballers
Oriente Petrolero players
Club Real Potosí players
Club Destroyers players
Deportes Quindío footballers
Chilean Primera División players
Argentine Primera División players
Expatriate footballers in Argentina
Expatriate footballers in Bolivia
Expatriate footballers in Chile
Expatriate footballers in Colombia
Expatriate footballers in Venezuela
Paraguayan expatriate sportspeople in Argentina
Paraguayan expatriate sportspeople in Chile
Paraguayan expatriate sportspeople in Bolivia
Paraguayan expatriate sportspeople in Colombia
Paraguayan expatriate sportspeople in Venezuela
Association football defenders